The 2001 CIAU football season began on August 31, 2001, and concluded with the 37th Vanier Cup national championship on December 1 at the SkyDome in Toronto, Ontario, with the Saint Mary's Huskies winning their second championship. Twenty-four universities across Canada competed in CIAU football this season, the highest level of amateur play in Canadian football, under the auspices of the Canadian Interuniversity Athletics Union (CIAU).

Awards and records

Awards 
 Hec Crighton Trophy – Ben Chapdelaine, McMaster
 Presidents' Trophy – David Stipe, Bishop's
 Russ Jackson Award – Josh Alexander, Wilfrid Laurier
 J. P. Metras Trophy – Carl Gourgues, Laval
 Peter Gorman Trophy – Jeremy Steeves, St. Francis Xavier

All-Canadian team 
 First team 

 Offence 
 QB Ben Chapdelaine, McMaster
 RB Luis Perez, Saint Mary's
 RB Mike Bradley, Waterloo
 WR Jason Currie, Saint Mary's
 WR Chris Rankin, McMaster
 IR James MacLean, Queen's
 IR Jason Clermont, Regina
 OT Dan Gyetvai, Windsor
 OT Jean-Michel Sylvain, Saint Mary's
 OG Devin Rodger, Manitoba
 OG Carl Gourgues, Laval
 C Christopher Bochen, Manitoba

 Defence 
 DE Chuck Walsh, Waterloo
 DE Karim Grant, Acadia
 DT Israel Idonije, Manitoba
 DT Doug Borden, Saint Mary's
 LB Scott Coe, Manitoba
 LB Jeff Zimmer, Regina
 LB Mark Pretzlaff, Ottawa
 CB Curtis Nash, Saint Mary's
 CB Darnell Edwards, Manitoba
 DB Scott Gordon, Ottawa
 DB Dennis Mavrin, York
 S David Stipe, Bishop's

 Special teams 
 K Jamie Boreham, Manitoba
 P Burke Dales, Concordia
 Second Team 

 Offence 
 QB Ryan Jones, Saint Mary's
 RB Mathieu Brassard, Laval
 RB Kenneth Vermette, Manitoba
 WR Joe Orel, Manitoba
 WR Jonathan Bohnert, Guelph
 IR Mike Palmer, Guelph
 IR Patrick Thibeault, Saint Mary's
 OT François Boulianne, Laval
 OT Todd Krenbrink, Regina
 OG Ryan Donnelly, McMaster
 OG John Salmas, Saint Mary's
 C Colin Oldrieve, Saint Mary's

 Defence 
 DE Hughes Beauchamp, Laval
 DE Warren Doekper, Manitoba
 DT Rob Stewart, Manitoba
 DT John MacDonald, McGill
 LB Adam MacDonald, StFX
 LB Javier Glatt, UBC
 LB Damian Porter, Windsor
 CB Eric Duchene, Saskatchewan
 CB Brad German, Ottawa
 DB Derick Fury, Mount Allison
 DB Gregory Hoover, Calgary
 S Jamie Boreham, Manitoba

 Special teams 
 K Norman Nasser, Guelph
 P Matt Armstrong, Waterloo

Results

Regular-season standings 
Note: GP = Games Played, W = Wins, L = Losses, OTL = Overtime Losses, PF = Points For, PA = Points Against, Pts = Points

Teams in bold have earned playoff berths.

 Top 10 

Ranks in italics'' are teams not ranked in the top 10 poll but received votes.
NR = Not Ranked. Source:

Championships 
The Vanier Cup is played between the champions of the Atlantic Bowl and the Churchill Bowl, the national semi-final games. This year, the winners of the Canada West conference Hardy Trophy hosted the Ontario conference's Yates Cup championship team for the Churchill Bowl. The winners of the Atlantic conference Loney Bowl championship hosted the Dunsmore Cup Quebec champion for the Atlantic Bowl.

Vanier Cup

Notes 

U Sports football seasons
CIS football season